The Road to Denver is a 1955 American Western film directed by Joseph Kane starring John Payne, Mona Freeman, Lee J. Cobb, Ray Middleton and Skip Homeier. The supporting cast features Lee Van Cleef, Andy Clyde, Glenn Strange and Emory Parnell.

Plot
Bill Mayhew is constantly getting his wild younger brother Sam out of trouble, even serving a prison sentence in Sam's place once.  Because of their reputation, the brothers change names and head their separate ways.

Bill lands a job with John Sutton, a livery stable owner, and is attracted to Sutton's daughter, Elizabeth. He likes Sutton's idea of starting a stagecoach line to Denver, and intends to go along on the stage's first journey, guarding a shipment of gold.

Sam turns up and is hired by saloonkeeper Jim Donovan, who wants to control all businesses, Sutton's included. When he deduces they are brothers, Donovan pretends to hold Sam hostage until Bill brings him the gold. Bill double-crosses him and makes sure the gold is safe. Sam, feeling his brother a fool, demands a showdown. Bill outdraws him, shoots the gun from his hand, then turns his back. Sam finally reforms, even becoming a stagecoach driver for Sutton.

Cast

References

External links 
 

1955 films
American Western (genre) films
1955 Western (genre) films
Republic Pictures films
Films directed by Joseph Kane
Trucolor films
1950s English-language films
1950s American films